Mungo George Marsh (31 December 1884 – 9 October 1940) was an Australian rules footballer who played with Collingwood in the Victorian Football League (VFL).

Notes

External links 

George Marsh's profile at Collingwood Forever

1884 births
1940 deaths
Australian rules footballers from Victoria (Australia)
Collingwood Football Club players
Coburg Football Club players